Roberta Pedranzini (born 21 August 1971) is an Italian ski mountaineer.

Pedranzini was born in Bormio. She started ski mountaineering in 2000 and competed first in the Giro del Monviso race in 2003. She has been member of the Italian national team since 2004.

Selected results 
 2004:
 2nd, Sellaronda Skimarathon (together with Francesca Martinelli)
 2005:
 7th, European Championship single race
 2006:
 1st, World Championship single race
 1st, World Championship team race (together with Francesca Martinelli)
 1st, World Championship relay race (together with Francesca Martinelli, Chiara Raso and Gloriana Pellissier)
 1st, World Cup single
 1st, Tour du Rutor (together with Francesca Martinelli)
 2nd, World Championship vertical race
 2007:
 1st, European Championship team race (together with Francesca Martinelli)
 1st, European Championship relay race (together with Francesca Martinelli and Gloriana Pellissier)
 1st, European Championship combination ranking
 1st, World Cup single
 1st, Sellaronda Skimarathon (together with Francesca Martinelli)
 2nd, European Championship vertical race
 2nd, European Championship single race
 2008:
 1st, World Championship single race
 1st, World Championship vertical race
 1st, World Championship team race (together with Francesca Martinelli)
 1st, World Championship combination ranking
 1st, Dolomiti Cup team (together with Francesca Martinelli)
 2nd, World Championship relay race (together with Gloriana Pellissier, Francesca Martinelli and Elisa Fleischmann)
 2009:
 1st, European Championship single race
 1st, European Championship vertical race
 1st, European Championship team race (together with Francesca Martinelli)
 1st, European Championship relay race (together with Gloriana Pellissier and Francesca Martinelli)
 1st, European Championship combination ranking
 1st, Tour du Rutor (together with Francesca Martinelli)
 2nd, Dachstein Xtreme
 3rd, Valtellina Orobie World Cup race
 2010:
 1st, World Championship relay race (together with Francesca Martinelli and Silvia Rocca)
 1st, World Championship vertical race
 1st, World Championship team race (together with Francesca Martinelli)
 1st, World Championship combination ranking
 2nd, World Championship single race
 2011:
 2nd, World Championship team race (together with Francesca Martinelli)
 1st and course record, Sellaronda Skimarathon (together with Francesca Martinelli)

Pierra Menta 

 2006: 1st, together with Francesca Martinelli
 2007: 1st, together with Francesca Martinelli
 2008: 2nd, together with Francesca Martinelli
 2009: 1st, together with Francesca Martinelli
 2010: 1st, together with Francesca Martinelli
 2011: 2nd, together with Francesca Martinelli
 2012: 1st, together with Francesca Martinelli

Trofeo Mezzalama 

 2007: 1st,together with Francesca Martinelli and Gloriana Pellissier
 2009: 1st,together with Francesca Martinelli and Laëtitia Roux
 2011: 1st, together with Francesca Martinelli and Gloriana Pellissier

Patrouille des Glaciers 

 2010: 2nd, together with Silvia Rocca and Francesca Martinelli

External links 
 Roberta Pedranzini at skimountaineering.org

References 

1971 births
Living people
Sportspeople from the Province of Sondrio
Italian female ski mountaineers
World ski mountaineering champions